Greatest Hits is the first compilation album by Australian rock band Noiseworks. Released in 1992, it peaked at No. 4 in Australia and was certified platinum in 1993.

Background
After releasing three studio albums, Noiseworks completed a national tour in March 1992 and disbanded shortly after. Band member, Jon Stevens pursued opportunities on a different kind of stage and starred as Judas in the 1992 highly acclaimed and successful Australian Musical Production of Andrew Lloyd Webber's Jesus Christ Superstar.

A greatest hit album was released to collate the group's singles and included three Australian top twenty singles, "Take Me Back", "Touch" and "Hot Chilli Woman". The songs appear in chronological order of release.
A live recording of the Beatles' song "Let It Be" was released as the first and only single. It was recorded at their live concert in March 1992.

Track listing
 "No Lies"
 "Take Me Back"
 "Welcome to the World"
 "Love Somebody"
 "Burning Feeling"
 "Touch"
 "Simple Man"
 "Voice of Reason"
 "In My Youth"
 "Freedom"
 "Miles & Miles"
 "Hot Chilli Woman"
 "R.I.P. (Millie)"
 "Take You Higher" (with Vika & Linda Bull)
 "Let It Be" (live)

Chart positions

Weekly charts
Greatest Hits debuted at No. 16 in Australia and peaked at No. 4 two weeks later.

Year-end charts

Certifications

References

1992 compilation albums
Noiseworks albums
Columbia Records compilation albums